Hugh Pritchard (born 1 March 1968) is a British biathlete. He competed in the men's relay event at the 2002 Winter Olympics.

References

External links
 

1968 births
Living people
British male biathletes
Olympic biathletes of Great Britain
Biathletes at the 2002 Winter Olympics
People from Whitstable